Migdol, or migdal, is a Hebrew word (מגדּלה  מגדּל, מגדּל  מגדּול) which means either a tower (from its size or height), an elevated stage (a rostrum or pulpit), or a raised bed (within a river). Physically, it can mean fortified land, i.e. a walled city or castle; or elevated land, as in a raised bed, like a platform, possibly a lookout. 

Migdol is a known loanword from Egyptian (mktr), mekter, or mgatir meaning "fort", "fortification", or "stronghold". The corresponding term in Coptic is ⲙⲉϣⲧⲱⲗ meštôl. Figuratively, "tower" has connotations of proud authority.

In archaeology, migdol is a specific type of temple, examples of which have been discovered for instance at Hazor, Megiddo, Tel Haror, Pella and Shechem.

Places named Migdol or Migdal in the Hebrew Bible
The Book of Exodus records that the children of Israel encamped at Pi-Hahiroth between Migdol and the Red Sea, before their crossing. It also appears in a couple of extra-biblical sources: Papyrus Anastasis V (20:2-3) implies that Migdol was built by Pharaoh Seti I of the 19th dynasty, the same king who first established the city of Piramesses; according to a map of the Way of Horus, Migdol is east of the Dwelling of the Lion, which has been located at Tell el-Borg, near the north coast of the Sinai Peninsula and the estuary of the Ballah Lakes.

Joshua referred to Migdal-Gad, ‘tower of Gad’, one of the fortified cities of Judah, and also to Migdal-El, ‘tower of God’, one of the fortified towns of Naphtali and the city of origin of Mary Magdelene (Magdala) (and ). 

Jeremiah referred to Migdol (Jeremiah 44:1) in its near-geographical relation to Tahpanhes and Memphis, three Egyptian cities where the Jewish people settled after the Siege of Jerusalem (587 BC).  

Ezekiel referred to Migdol in describing the length of the land of Egypt "from Migdol to Syene (Aswan)".. 

The letters of Šuta refer to a "Magdalu in Egypt" which Albright identified with Jeremiah's Migdol.

Places in modern Israel named Migdal
Migdal is a town in the northern district of Israel, 8 km north of Tiberias.

Migdal Ha'emek is a city in modern-day Israel, situated on a large hill surrounded by the Kishon river, west of Nazareth.

References

Torah places